Elizabeth Ann Roads,  (née Bruce; born 1951) is a former Scottish herald, an office from which she retired in 2021; in July 2018 she retired as Lyon Clerk at the Court of the Lord Lyon

Personal life and education
Elizabeth Roads is the daughter of Lt Col. James Bruce MC and his wife Mary Hope Sinclair. She was born in 1951 and educated at Lansdowne House in Edinburgh, the Cambridgeshire College of Technology, the Study Centre for Fine Art in London, and Edinburgh Napier University (LLB with distinction). She married Christopher Roads in 1983, and they have two sons Timothy and William and a daughter Emily.

Heraldic career
Elizabeth Roads joined the staff of the Court of the Lord Lyon in 1975 and was appointed Lyon Clerk and Keeper of the Records in 1986 an office she held until her retirement in 2018.  In this position, she maintained, among other things, the Public Register of All Arms and Bearings in Scotland.  She was appointed Linlithgow Pursuivant in 1987, becoming the first female Officer of arms in the world. This was a temporary appointment, when she represented the Lord Lyon in Canada in the discussions that led to the establishment of the Canadian Heraldic Authority. Roads was appointed Carrick Pursuivant in 1992 and promoted to Snowdoun Herald in 2010, and retired from being an officer of arms in 2021. She was appointed Secretary of the Order of the Thistle in 2014, having been Deputy Secretary since 2008.

As Elizabeth Bruce, Roads was a founder member of the Heraldry Society of Scotland in 1977.  She was Chairman of that Society in the late 1990s and is now a Fellow of the Heraldry Society of Scotland, of the Heraldry Society of New Zealand and of the Heraldry Society, and an Honorary Fellow of the Royal Heraldry Society of Canada. She is an Academician of the Academie Internationale d'Heraldique and a Fellow of the Society of Antiquaries and of the Society of Antiquaries of Scotland, honours in recognition of her heraldic expertise. She has published many articles and lectures regularly on heraldic and genealogical subjects.

She is current (2022) President of the Academie Internationale d'Heraldique and a former President of the Bureau Permanent des Congres Genealogique and Heraldique. She also serves on the board of the International Commission on Orders of Chivalry and the Confederation of Genealogy and Heraldry.

In addition to her heraldic interests she is Vice Chair of the Scottish Council on Archives, a Trustee of the Black Watch Museum and Dean of the 900 year old Merchant Guildry of Stirling.

Orders and decorations

Arms

See also
Heraldry
Pursuivant
Herald
The Court of the Lord Lyon
The Heraldry Society of Scotland

External links
The Court of the Lord Lyon
The Heraldry Society of Scotland

References

Scottish officers of arms
Scottish genealogists
Members of the Royal Victorian Order
Fellows of the Society of Antiquaries of London
1951 births
Living people
British women historians